A mud sledge is a sled used to cross mud flats such as estuaries and bays.

Mud flats are difficult to cross because even shallow draft boats will get stuck while pedestrians and wheeled vehicles bog down easily too.   A mud sledge is a traditional device used by fishermen when they collect from nets, pots and traps which they set out in tidal waters.  The traditional designs vary but, typically, they have a flat wooden base and are propelled by scooting with one or both legs.

Traditional fishing in this way has declined in modern industrial countries, but the sledges may still be used for races and sport.

England
Fishing in the mudflats of the Bristol Channel was traditionally done using a mud horse but in 2019 there was only known to be one fisherman left using this technique.  The technique of the Sellick family, which did this for generations, was to bend over the table-like horse and push from behind using both legs.

Germany
There are many names for a mud sledge in the various German dialects including Creier, Kraaite, Kraite, Kreier, Kreyer, Schlickrutscher. Schusch, Slykslide and Wattschlitten.

Races with mud sledges (Schlikschlittenrennen) take place in German villages including Dangast, Dyksterhusen, Pilsum, Pogum and Upleward-Greetsiel.

Japan

Mud sledges are used in Japan where they are called gataita or haneita. Similar sledges are observed also in South Korea.

China
Mud sledges are widely used on intertidal zones along the East China Sea in mainland China, including Macau.

Southeast Asia
In Vietnam, Thailand, and Malaysia, mud sledges are found. In Indonesia, around Surabaya of eastern Java as well as on immense muddy tidal zones at eastern Sumatra, mud sledges are ubiquitously ranged.

References

Racing vehicles
Sledding
Sliding vehicles